Curly Ray Cline (born Ray Cline; January 10, 1923 – August 19, 1997) was an American bluegrass fiddler from West Virginia known for his work with the Lonesome Pine Fiddlers and Ralph Stanley.

Biography
Cline was born in Mingo County, West Virginia. He learned the basics from his father, but other than that he was self-taught. While he was growing up playing the fiddle, he was inspired by Fiddlin' Arthur Smith of the Grand Ole Opry. Curly and his brothers were all musically talented, but Curly Ray and brother Charlie Cline were especially gifted.

When Curly Ray was 15 years old, he, along with his cousin Ezra and brother Ned formed the Lonesome Pine Fiddlers around 1938. The Lonesome Pine Fiddlers started off playing on radio station WHIS in the nearby town of Bluefield, where they remained until 1952. Although during this time Curly and brother Charlie Cline were also playing in Jimmy Martin's band, the Sunny Mountain Boys. Occasionally, Curly Ray did studio work for many musicians such as Jimmy Martin, Bobby Osborne, Rex and Eleanor Parker and Hobo Jack Adkins. He continued to perform with the Fiddlers intermittently through the early 1960s.

In early 1963, Curly Ray left the Fiddlers to play with The Stanley Brothers. He played with them on a part-time basis until Carter Stanley's death in 1966. When Ralph Stanley reconfigured the band in 1967, Curly Ray signed on as his full-time fiddler. Curly Ray appears on every succeeding record until his retirement in 1993. He was succeeded by fellow West Virginian James Price.

Curly Ray's fiddling blended in perfectly with Ralph Stanley's music. Curly's playing was that of the old time bluegrass. Cline had a deep passion for old time music, as he did for bluegrass. Ralph Stanley felt the same way about his music. The two became very good friends while touring together. Ralph Stanley said of Curly Ray, at Curly Ray's funeral: "He plays the fiddle sort of the way I play the banjo, he plays it the way he feels it."

While playing in Ralph Stanley's Clinch Mountain Boys, Curly Ray released a few solo, mostly instrumental, records. On these albums, Cline combined his own vocal sound effects, including sounds of barking hounds and braying mules, with traditional bluegrass songs. He did hardly any solo singing until about 1972, when he began to sing comedy numbers to add variety to Ralph's shows.

Discography
 And His Lonesome Pine Fiddle (Melody MLP-17) 1969
 The Working Man (Jalyn JLP-126) 1970
 Chicken Reel (Rebel SLP-1498) 1971
 They Cut Down the Old Pine Tree (Rebel SLP-1509) 1972
 My Little Home In West Virginia (Rebel SLP-1515) 1972
 Fishing For Another Hit (Rebel SLP-1531) 1974
 Why Me Ralph? (Rebel SLP-1545) 1975
 It's Bread And Water For... (Rebel SLP-1566) 1977
 Who's Gonna Mow My Grass (Rebel SLP-1577) 1978
 Boar Hog (Old Homestead OHS-90138) 1980
 The Old Kentucky Fox Hunter Plays Gospel (Old Homestead OHS-70047) 1982
 Smarter Than The Average Idiot (Tin Ear TE-33010) 1984
 The Deputy (Nashville Country NCLP 101) 1988
 Together Again At Their Best (River Track Studios RTS-1341) c1990 (cassette shown as by Curly Ray, Charley and Timmy Cline)

References

1923 births
1997 deaths
American bluegrass fiddlers
Musicians from West Virginia
20th-century American musicians